The Billboard Latin Digital Songs, or Latin Digital Song Sales, is a record chart that ranks the best-selling Spanish-language digital songs in the United States, as compiled by Nielsen SoundScan and published weekly by Billboard. It was introduced in the issue dated January 23, 2010 and merges all versions of a song sold from digital music distributors. Its data was incorporated in the Hot Latin Songs chart on October 22, 2012.

As of the issue for the week ending on May 1, 2021, "Canción Bonita" by Carlos Vives and Ricky Martin is at number one.

Records

Songs with most weeks at number one

94 weeks – Don Omar featuring Lucenzo – "Danza Kuduro" (2011–13)
69 weeks – Luis Fonsi and Daddy Yankee featuring Justin Bieber – "Despacito" (2017–18)
49 weeks – Enrique Iglesias featuring Descemer Bueno and Gente de Zona – "Bailando" (2014–15)
42 weeks – Shakira featuring Freshlyground – "Waka Waka (This Time for Africa)" (2010–11)
38 weeks – Nicky Jam and Enrique Iglesias – "El Perdón" (2015–16)
33 weeks – José Feliciano – "Feliz Navidad" (2010–22)
20 weeks – Marc Anthony – "Vivir Mi Vida" (2013–14)

Source:

Songs with most total weeks on the chart
494 weeks – Don Omar featuring Lucenzo – "Danza Kuduro" (2010–22)
396 weeks – Shakira featuring Freshlyground – "Waka Waka (This Time for Africa)" (2010–22)
383 weeks – Shakira featuring Wyclef Jean – "Hips Don't Lie" (2010–2017)
358 weeks – Ricky Martin – "Livin' la Vida Loca" (2010–22)
356 weeks – Shakira – "Suerte" (2010–22)

Artists with most number-one singles
13 – Shakira
12 – J Balvin
12 – Bad Bunny
10 – Ozuna
9 – Daddy Yankee

See also
Hot Latin Songs

References

Billboard charts
Latin music